Cheah Tong Kim (born 29 July 1945) is a Malaysian former swimmer. He competed in two events at the 1964 Summer Olympics.

References

1945 births
Living people
Malaysian male swimmers
Olympic swimmers of Malaysia
Swimmers at the 1964 Summer Olympics
Commonwealth Games competitors for Malaysia
Swimmers at the 1966 British Empire and Commonwealth Games
Place of birth missing (living people)